"The Light" is a song by the American progressive rock group Spock's Beard. It is the first track on their debut album, The Light. It is one of the most well known songs by the band and was ranked as the second best Modern Prog Song of the 1990-2015 period by The Prog Report in 2017. It is one of the band's most played songs.

Live appearances 
 Official Live Bootleg/The Beard Is out There  
 Live at the Whisky and NEARfest
 Don't Try This at Home
 From the Vault
 Gluttons for Punishment
 There and Here
 Live at High Voltage Festival
 Live at Sea

Structure 
All sections written by Neal Morse unless noted.
I. The Dream (0:00–0:48)
II. One Man (Alan Morse, Neal Morse) (0:48–5:14)
III. Garden People (5:14–6:46)
IV. Look Straight into the Light (6:46–9:05)
V. The Man in the Mountain (9:05–11:10)
VI. Señor Valasco's Mystic Voodoo Love Dance (11:10–12:46)
VII. The Return of the Horrible Catfish Man (12:46–14:36)
VIII. The Dream (14:36–15:32)

Personnel
Neal Morse - lead vocals, keyboards
Alan Morse - guitars, cello, vocals
Dave Meros - bass
Nick D'Virgilio - drums, vocals

References

1995 songs
Spock's Beard songs

de:Spock’s Beard
es:Spock's Beard
fr:Spock's Beard
it:Spock's Beard
hu:Spock’s Beard
nl:Spock's Beard
no:Spock's Beard
pl:Spock's Beard
pt:Spock's Beard
ru:Spock’s Beard
fi:Spock's Beard
sv:Spock's Beard
zh:Spock's Beard